Elections to the Punjab Legislative Assembly were held in 1967, to elect members of the 104 constituencies in Punjab, India. It resulted in a hung Assembly with the Indian National Congress as the largest party with 48 seats.

Voter Statistics

Political Parties

List of Participating Political Parties in Punjab Assembly Election in 1967

Results 

Parties in green box formed coalition government

Results by Constituency

Government formation
After result Gurnam Singh formed the government but in November 1967 Lashman Singh Gill with 16 MLAs defected and with the support of Indian National Congress formed government which lasted till August 1968.

References

Punjab
State Assembly elections in Punjab, India
1960s in Punjab, India